Sir Mountstuart Elphinstone Grant Duff  (21 February 1829 – 12 January 1906), known as M. E. Grant Duff before 1887 and as Sir Mountstuart Grant Duff thereafter, was a Scottish politician, administrator and author.  He served as the Under-Secretary of State for India from 1868 to 1874, Under-Secretary of State for the Colonies from 1880 to 1881 and the Governor of Madras from 1881 to 1886.

He was born in Eden, Aberdeenshire, on 21 February 1829 to the distinguished British historian James Grant Duff. He had his education at Grange School and Balliol College, Oxford, and graduated in law from the Inns of Court. He practised and taught law for a short time before starting a political life and entering the House of Commons as the Liberal Member of Parliament for Elgin Burghs.

His abilities won him government positions and he was Under-Secretary of State for India, Under-Secretary of State for the Colonies and Governor of Madras. On his return from Madras, he retired from politics and served in various art and scientific societies.

He travelled extensively and wrote voluminously. His performance in politics and administration has received mixed reviews during the 1880s: "a politician of brilliant promise and scant performance, of wide information which he seemed to turn to much account, of abilities which would have made the fortunes of half a dozen men and of which he made little enough."

He was made a Companion of the Order of the Indian Empire and a Grand Commander of the Order of the Star of India. He died on 12 January 1906 at the age of 76.

Early life and education
He was born in Eden, Banff, Banffshire on 21 February 1829, the elder son of James Grant Duff, a well known Indian official from Bombay Presidency and British Resident in the princely state of Satara, and his wife Jane Catherine, daughter of Sir Whitelaw Ainslie. He was named after Mountstuart Elphinstone whom James Grant Duff regarded as his mentor. He had his schooling at Edinburgh Academy and Grange School and at Balliol College, Oxford, from 1847 to 1850. He completed his master's degree in 1853. During these years he experienced problems with his vision, and for the rest of his life he relied on the sight of others.

He studied law at the Inns of Court and passed with honours, appearing next to James Fitzjames Stephen. He was called to the bar at Inner Temple, London on 17 November 1854 and practised as a junior under William Ventris Field. During this time he lectured at the Working Men's College and wrote for the Saturday Review. Soon afterwards, he entered politics and joined the Liberal Party.

Political career
In the 1857 election he was elected to the House of Commons as the Liberal Party's candidate for Elgin Burghs.  He was a member of the House of Commons from 1857 to 1881. As a parliamentarian, he took up the cause of education in his constituency and gave regular annual speeches on foreign policy.  In order to make these speeches as informative and realistic, he took trips abroad to study the situation in foreign countries. In 1879, he met with Karl Marx and remarked "Altogether my impression of Marx, allowing for his being at the opposite pole of opinion from oneself, was not at all unfavourable and I would gladly meet him again."

Government positions 
His proficiency and expertise on foreign issues won him positions in the foreign ministry. Sir Charles W. Dilke declined the role of Under-Secretary of State for Foreign Affairs and suggested to Prime Minister William Ewart Gladstone that Grant Duff be appointed. Gladstone refused but appointed Grant Duff as Under-Secretary of State for India on 8 December 1868, a position he filled until 1874 when the Liberal Party government of Gladstone resigned. He worked well with the Secretary of State Argyll; their relationship was described by Duthie as 'rather deliberately obedient to Argyll; and always in agreement with him on policy'. During Grant Duff's tenure, the Kuka insurrection broke out in India. The massacre of 50 rebelling Kukas sparked outrage in Parliament and Grant Duff was compelled to accept responsibility.

When Gladstone was voted back to power in 1880, Grant Duff was appointed Under-Secretary of State for the Colonies. He served till 26 June 1881, when he was appointed Governor of Madras. During this time, he also served on Her Majesty's Most Honourable Privy Council.

Governor of Madras 
He was captivated by the beach at Madras on an earlier visit to the city. As a result, when he became governor in 1881 he immediately commenced the construction of a promenade along the beach. The beach was extensively modified and layered with soft sand and was named "The Marina". The promenade was opened to the public in 1884.

On the naming of the beach, Grant Duff explained in a letter:

In 1864, several specimens of a yellow flowering Iris were collected by Mr. B. T. Lowne on the banks of the river Kishon in Israel. It was later found by Grant Duff on the plains of Esdraelon (Jezreel Valley). The iris was then named after him, Iris grant-duffii.

He was a strong supporter of Dietrich Brandis in his reorganization of the Madras Forest Department and expansion of systematic forest conservancy in India.

His tenure was filled with a number of controversies and allegations of partisan behaviour and injustice. He was sharply criticized for the way he handled the Chingleput Ryots' Case and the arrests and trials following the Salem Riots of 1882. The Hindu accused him of indulging in vindictive and vengeful behaviour. In one of the articles, he was criticized thus: "Oh! Lucifer! How art thou fallen? Oh! Mr Grant-Duff, how you stand like an extinct volcano in the midst of the ruins of your abortive reputation as an administrator! Erudite you may be, but a statesman you are not." He was also accused of deliberately nurturing a movement against Brahmins.

However, Louis Mallet, the then Under-Secretary of State for India, was all praise for him. On receipt of his last minute as governor, Mallett said, "I doubt whether any governor has left behind so able and so complete a record".

W. S. Blunt, the British publicist, who visited Madras in November 1884, said of Grant Duff:

The Madras Mahajana Sabha was established in 1884 with P. Rangaiah Naidu as its president and R. Balaji Rao as its vice-president. This is considered to be one of the oldest Indian political organisations in the Madras Presidency, notwithstanding the Madras Native Association, which was a failure.  Members of the Madras Mahajana Sabha played a pivotal role in corresponding with Indian associations in other provinces and forming the Indian National Congress in 1885. The Indian National Congress held its first session at Bombay in December 1885, attended by 72 delegates including 22 from the Madras Presidency. Grant Duff was made a Companion of the Order of the Indian Empire in 1881 and a Grand Commander of the Order of the Star of India in March 1887. In July 1886, Gladstone tried to get a peerage for him but failed.

On an official visit to Rome a few years after the conclusion of his tenure, Grant Duff records that the Speaker of the Italian Parliament Biancheri inquired about the size of the province that Grant Duff had governed. On receiving the reply that the province was 'larger than Italy, including all the Italian islands', Biancheri astonishedly asked "What an empire is that, in which such a country is only a province?".

Later life
On his return to England in 1887, he devoted himself to the arts and sciences. He was Lord Rector of University of Aberdeen in 1866–1872. He was member of the Athenaeum, the Cosmopolitan Club, Literary Society, Grillion's Club, Breakfast Club and was the president of the Royal Geographical Society from 1889 to 1893 and of the Royal Historical Society from 1892 to 1899. He was treasurer of the exclusive dining club known as The Club from 1893. He was elected a Fellow of the Royal Society in 1881, and was appointed a trustee of the British Museum in 1903.

He was Chairman of the Liberty and Property Defence League, established to curb socialist tendencies in the Liberal Party.

Personal life
In April 1859 he married Anna Julia Webster; they had four sons and four daughters. Their eldest daughter was Clare Annabel Caroline, wife of the financier Frederick Huth Jackson, whilst their third son, Adrian Grant-Duff, colonel of the Black Watch, was killed at the First Battle of the Aisne in September 1914. Adrian's daughter was Shiela Grant Duff while his son, Neill, was killed at Houdetot near St Valery-en-Caux France in 1940 whilst serving with the Black Watch.
He died in his home in Chelsea, London in January 1906, aged 76, and was buried in Elgin Cathedral, Scotland.

Ancestry

Works 
  (Scan)
  (Scan)
  (Scan)
  (Scan)
 Notes from a diary. London: John Murray. - (1851-1872):1 2 - (1873-1881):1 2 - (1881-1886):1 2 - (1886-1888):1 2 - (1889-1891):1 2 - (1892-1895):1 2 - (1896-1901):1 2  
  (Scan)
  volume 1 volume 2

Notes

References

External links 

 
 

1829 births
1906 deaths
Alumni of Balliol College, Oxford
Liberal Party (UK) MPs for English constituencies
Members of the Privy Council of the United Kingdom
Companions of the Order of the Indian Empire
Knights Grand Commander of the Order of the Star of India
Fellows of the Royal Society
UK MPs 1857–1859
UK MPs 1859–1865
UK MPs 1865–1868
UK MPs 1868–1874
UK MPs 1874–1880
UK MPs 1880–1885
Presidents of the Royal Geographical Society
Presidents of the Royal Historical Society
Rectors of the University of Aberdeen
People from Banffshire